Andrés Pascual Santoja (born 18 November 1996), commonly known as Sito, is a Spanish professional footballer who plays for Greek Super League club Asteras Tripolis FC mainly as a left winger.

Club career
Born in Alcoy, Alicante, Valencian Community, Sito joined Valencia CF's youth setup after spells at CD Vedruna and CD Alcoyano. On 29 March 2014, while still a junior, he made his debut with the former's reserve team in a 0–0 Segunda División B home draw against Elche CF Ilicitano.

On 13 April 2014 Sito scored his first senior goal, netting the first in a 3–0 home win against Huracán Valencia CF. He was definitely promoted to the B-team in July 2014, but appeared rarely during the campaign.

On 13 May 2016 Sito made his first team – and La Liga – debut, coming on as a late substitute for Pablo Piatti in a 0–1 home loss against Real Sociedad. On 8 August of the following year, he was loaned to Segunda División side Lorca FC, for one year.

On 4 January 2017, Sito cut ties with Lorca and subsequently returned to Valencia and its B-team. On 6 August 2019, he terminated his contract with the Che and moved abroad, joining a host of compatriots at Greek side Asteras Tripolis FC.

Career statistics

References

External links

Stats and bio at Ciberche 

1996 births
Living people
People from Alcoy
Sportspeople from the Province of Alicante
Spanish footballers
Footballers from the Valencian Community
Association football wingers
La Liga players
Segunda División B players
Super League Greece players
Valencia CF Mestalla footballers
Valencia CF players
Lorca FC players
Asteras Tripolis F.C. players
Spanish expatriate footballers
Spanish expatriate sportspeople in Greece
Expatriate footballers in Greece